Krešo Ljubičić (born 26 September 1988) is a footballer. He is a player-coach with German fifth-tier Hessenliga club Hanau 93. Born in Germany, he represented Croatia at various youth international levels up to the under-21s.

Club career
In 2007–08, Ljubičić joined Eintracht Frankfurt coming from the club's youth academy where he got regular experience at Eintracht Frankfurt U23. In June 2009, he moved to Hajduk Split after his contract in Frankfurt expired.

On 3 February 2021, he joined Hanau 93.

Career statistics

References

External links
 
 Krešo Ljubičić at Sportnet.hr 
 Krešo Ljubičić at eintracht-archiv.de 

1988 births
Living people
Sportspeople from Hanau
Footballers from Hesse
German people of Croatian descent
Association football midfielders
German footballers
Croatian footballers
Croatia youth international footballers
Croatia under-21 international footballers
Eintracht Frankfurt players
HNK Hajduk Split players
NK Hrvatski Dragovoljac players
HNK Hajduk Split II players
FC Biel-Bienne players
FC Winterthur players
FC Hanau 93 players
Bundesliga players
Regionalliga players
Croatian Football League players
Swiss Challenge League players
Oberliga (football) players
Croatian expatriate footballers
German expatriate footballers
Expatriate footballers in Switzerland
German expatriate sportspeople in Switzerland
Croatian expatriate sportspeople in Switzerland